The 4th Annual NFL Honors was the awards presentation by the National Football League honoring its best players and other individuals from the 2014 NFL season. It was held on January 31, 2015, and aired on NBC in the United States. Seth Meyers hosted the show. For the second year, the newest Pro Football Hall of Fame class was announced and introduced during the show with the Class of 2015 appearing on stage at Symphony Hall in Phoenix. Unlike the previous three NFL Honors presentations, the GMC Never Say Never Moment of the Year Award was not presented; although Aaron Rodgers was announced as the winner of the 2014 season award.

List of award winners

References

NFL Honors 004
2014 National Football League season
2015 sports awards
2015 in American football
2015 in sports in Arizona
2010s in Phoenix, Arizona
American football in Arizona